Fabienne Königstein  (née Amrhein; born 25 November 1992) is a German long-distance and cross-country runner. Her major achievements by now were the 6th place at the World University Games 2017 over the Halfmarathon distance, the German Marathon Title 2018 and the 11th place at the European Athletics Championships 2018 in the Women's Marathon Competition. She also is a several times medalist in German National Championships.

Athletic career

Fabienne Königstein had her first overall appearance in 1997 at the age of 5 for the TSG Wiesloch. In 2001 at the age of 8 she joined SG Nußloch. During the following 5 years she received a basic combined athletic education. To focus on her particular talent for running, Königstein joined the Track and Field Team of Christian Stang at MTG Mannheim in 2006 at the age of 13. After her first appearance at German National Championships in 2008 over the 400m Hurdles (U16) she regularly participated in national and international championships.

In 2013, at the age of 20, Königstein accomplished the breakthrough in the German National Women's competition with a 5th place at the 5000m race  and also had her premier appearance for the German National Team at the European Cross-Country Championships in Belgrade. At the European Cross-Country Championships in Chia, Italy, in 2016 she placed 20th in the Women's competition. Amrhein won the silver medal at the German Cross-Country Championships, placed 6th at the World University Games in Taipei over the 21.1 km and celebrated her debut over the Marathon distance at the Berlin Marathon. In adverse weather conditions she finished 11th after 2h 34min and 14sec in a world class field lead by Gladys Cherono. In spring 2018 Königstein finished 3d at the German Half Marathon Championships. Three weeks later at 29 April 2018 she won her first gold medal at the German Marathon Championship, finishing 2nd at the Düsseldorf Marathon behind Volha Mazuronak in 2h 32min and 34sec.

On her first appearance at European Marathon Championships in Berlin 2018, Königstein placed 11th, being the most successful German Athlete in this race. In December, Königstein concluded the season with a bronze medal at the SPAR European Cross-Country Championships in Tilburg. She placed 19th and, therefore, as the second-best German runner, although she had suffered a severe respiratory infection shortly before the race. By now, 2018 has been the most successful year in her career.

After a 18-months injury lay-off, Fabienne Königstein had a comeback in October 2020 at the World Half Marathon Championships in Gdynia, Poland, where she won the bronze medal with Team Germany.

Achievements

World Championships Honors
 2017 6th Summer Universiade, Taipei, Half Marathon
 2020 3rd Half Marathon World Championships with Team Germany

European Championships Honors
 2013 5th European Cross-Country Championships (U23) with Team Germany
 2014 4th SPAR European Cross-Country Championships (U23) with Team Germany
 2013, 2014 and 2015 participation in SPAR European Cross Country Championships (U23 and Women)
 2015 1st Oxford Half, Oxford (UK)
 2015 12th EAA-Permit, Cross de l'Acier, Leffrinckoucke (France)
 2016 11th EAA-Permit Warandeloop, Tilburg, (Netherlands)
 2016 20th European Cross Country Championships, Chia, Italy and 7th with Team Germany
 2017 22nd Great Edinburgh International Cross Country, Edinburgh (Scotland) and 2nd with Team Europe
 2017 28th European Cross Country Championships and 6th with Team Germany
 2018 11th European Championships Berlin (Marathon)
 2018 3rd European Cross Country Championships with Team Germany and individual 19th

National Championships Honors
 2010 3rd 1500m (U20)
 2011 3rd 1500m (U20)
 2012 1st Cross Country Team MTG (U23)
 2013 2nd "Deutsche Hochschulmeisterschaften" Cross-Country
 2013 3rd 5000m (U23)
 2014 1st "Deutsche Hochschulmeisterschaften" Cross-Country
 2015 1st "Deutsche Hochschulmeisterschaften" Cross-Country
 2015 1st "Deutsche Hochschulmeisterschaften" 3000m Indoor
 2015 3rd Cross-Country (Women)
 2015 3rd "Deutsche Hochschulmeisterschaften" 1500m
 2016 1st "Deutsche Hochschulmeisterschaften" 10 km
 2017 3rd "Deutsche Hochschulmeisterschaften" 3000m Indoor
 2017 2nd Cross-Country (Women)
 2017 1st "Deutsche Hochschulmeisterschaften" Halfmarathon
 2017 1st "Deutsche Hochschulmeisterschaften" 3000m
 2018 3rd Half Marathon
 2018 1st Marathon

Marathons
 2017 11th Berlin Marathon
 2018 2nd Düsseldorf Marathon
 2018 11th European Marathon Championships

Personal bests
 800 m: 2:11,12 min
 1500 m: 4:29,04 min
 Mile: 4:59,36 min
 3000 m: 9:13,97 min
 5000 m: 16:12,39 min
 10000 m: 33:46,14 min
 10 km (Road): 33:13 min
 Half marathon: 1h 11:39 min
 Marathon: 2h 32:34 min

Awards
 2012, 2014, 2015 and 2017 Sports Award City of Mannheim
 2018 Rhein-Neckar Award (Publikumsliebling)
 2018 German Road Races Award (Best female Road Runner of the Year)

References

External links

 Fabienne Amrhein at larasch.de (German)
 

1992 births
Living people
Sportspeople from Heidelberg
German female long-distance runners
German female marathon runners
German female cross country runners
20th-century German women
21st-century German women